Wunjo  may refer to:

*wunjō, a rune of the Germanic alphabet
Vunjo language, a Bantu language spoken in Tanzania